Novotroitskoye is a rural locality (a selo) and the administrative center of Novotroitskoye Rural Settlement, Petropavlovsky District, Voronezh Oblast, Russia. The population was 698 as of 2010. There are 10 streets.

References 

Rural localities in Petropavlovsky District, Voronezh Oblast